{{DISPLAYTITLE:Ribose 1-dehydrogenase (NADP+)}}

In enzymology, a ribose 1-dehydrogenase (NADP+) is an enzyme that catalyzes the chemical reaction

D-ribose + NADP+ + H2O  D-ribonate + NADPH + H+

The three substrates of this enzyme are D-ribose, NADP+, and H2O, whereas its 3 products are D-ribonate, NADPH, and H+.

This enzyme belongs to the family of oxidoreductases, specifically those acting on the CH-OH group of donor with NAD+ or NADP+ as acceptor. The systematic name of this enzyme class is D-ribose:NADP+ 1-oxidoreductase. Other names in common use include D-ribose dehydrogenase (NADP+), NADP+-pentose-dehydrogenase, and ribose 1-dehydrogenase (NADP+).

References

 
 

EC 1.1.1
NADPH-dependent enzymes
Enzymes of unknown structure